The Gate of Trajan or Trajan's Gate is a historic mountain pass near Ihtiman, Bulgaria. In antiquity, the pass was called Succi. Later it was named after Roman Emperor Trajan, on whose order a fortress by the name of Stipon was constructed on the hill over the pass, as a symbolic border between the provinces of Thrace and Macedonia.

The pass is primarily known for the major medieval battle of 17 August 986, during which the forces of Byzantine Emperor Basil II were routed by Tsar Samuil of Bulgaria, effectively halting a Byzantine campaign in the Bulgarian lands.

Today, a tunnel of Trakiya motorway similarly known as the Gate of Trajan Tunnel is near the fortress,  from Sofia.

The saddle known as Trajan Gate on Graham Land, Antarctica is named after the Gate of Trajan.

Notes

References

 
 

11th century in Bulgaria
Mountain passes of Bulgaria
Buildings and structures in Sofia Province
Roman fortifications in Thrace
Geography of medieval Thrace
History of Sofia Province
Castles in Bulgaria
Trajan
Landforms of Sofia Province